Major-General Charles Christopher Fowkes   (4 December 1894 – 1 July 1966) was an officer in the British Army during the Second World War.  His nickname was "Fluffy."

Military career
Fowkes was born in Lewisham, Kent, England, in 1894. He was educated at Dulwich College and the Royal Military College, Sandhurst. He was commissioned in the South Wales Borderers, at the start of the First World War. He won the Military Cross in 1918 and was wounded four times throughout the war. He then served in North Russia during the Russian Civil War.

Fowkes was highly critical of fascism; during the 1930s he criticised both Hitler's Nazi government and Mussolini's Fascist regime in Italy. Brigadier Fowkes participated in the East African Campaign commanding 22nd (East Africa) Infantry Brigade, part of Lieutenant-General Alan Cunningham's force based in Kenya. In August 1941 he was placed in temporary command of the 12th African Division and was confirmed in the role the following month. In November he led his division, supported by Ethiopian patriot forces in the final action of the East African campaign, the capture of Gondar on 27 November.

After the campaign Fowkes remained in East Africa on garrison duties until April 1943 when he was appointed to command 11th (East Africa) Division. It had been felt by the British authorities that African soldiers would be well suited to jungle warfare and so the division was sent in June 1943 to Ceylon for training and then in June 1944 to Burma to join Indian XXXIII Corps and take part in the Burma Campaign. From then until December, fighting in horrendous terrain through the monsoon (because African soldiers were thought to be less susceptible to malaria - which proved to be the case), Tales from the King's African Rifles by John Nunneley, 2000 the division fought in the notorious Kabaw Valley and cleared the west bank of the Chindwin river establishing three bridgeheads for Fourteenth Army on the other side. The division was then withdrawn to India to regroup and rest. Fowkes fell ill and was sent on leave at the end of 1944 to recuperate. Neither the division nor Fowkes saw any further action during the war and Fowkes retired from the army shortly after the war ended.

Fowkes was promoted to Major-General in 1941. He received the DSO for his efforts in the East African Campaign.

Fowkes retired to Britain's Kenya Colony in December 1945. He lived on a ranch just outside of what has since become Amboseli National Park; he could see Mount Kilimanjaro from his property and he was said to be particularly fond of "watching the elephants". In the 1954 Birthday Honours, as inspector general of the Kenya Police Reserve, he received the Colonial Police Medal. He died in 1966 in Malindi, Kenya, aged 71.

Command history
 Commanding Officer, Southern Brigade, Kenya - 1936 to 1939
 Commanding Officer, 2nd (East Africa) Infantry Brigade, East Africa - 1939 to 1940
 Acting General Officer, Commanding 2nd African Division, East Africa - 1940
 Commanding Officer, 2nd (East Africa) Infantry Brigade, East Africa - 1940
 Commanding Officer 22nd (East Africa) Infantry Brigade, East Africa - 1940 to 1941
 Acting General Officer Commanding, 12th African Division, East Africa - 1941
 Commanding Officer, 22nd (East Africa) Infantry Brigade, East Africa - 1941
 Acting General Officer Commanding, 12th African Division, East Africa - 1941
 General Officer Commanding, 12th African Division, East Africa - 1941 to 1942
 General Officer Commanding, 12th African Division, East Africa - 1942 to 1943
 General Officer Commanding, 11th (East Africa) Division, East Africa, Ceylon, and Burma - 1943 to 1944
 Retired - 1946

References

Bibliography

External links
Generals of World War II

1894 births
1966 deaths
British Army generals of World War II
British Army personnel of World War I
British Kenya people
Companions of the Distinguished Service Order
English anti-fascists
People from Lewisham
Recipients of the Colonial Police Medal
Recipients of the Military Cross
South Wales Borderers officers
British Army major generals
Graduates of the Royal Military College, Sandhurst
Military personnel from Kent
British Army personnel of the Russian Civil War
People educated at Dulwich College